Cois Fharraige was a three-day Irish surfing and music festival, first held in Kilkee, County Clare in 2007. The name is derived from the Irish language phrase meaning "beside the sea". It was notable as Ireland's first surfing and music festival and was a joint project between MCD and Sony Ericsson. The 2008 event was held from 5–7 September.

2007 festival
The 2007 event took place from 7–9 September in Kilkee, County Clare.

The first set of bands announced to play included Ocean Colour Scene, Fun Lovin' Criminals, Republic of Loose, The Blizzards, Kíla, Tom Baxter, Róisín Murphy and Buffalo Souljah. Within days, Badly Drawn Boy and The Enemy were added to the line-up.

The event ran on an invitation only basis, for surfers with a required standard of surfing. An invitation was issued from The West Coast Surf Club to all suitable applicants. The surf event offered 48 competitive places to applicants.

2007 line-up
Fun Lovin' Criminals – The Blizzards – Róisín Murphy – Majella Murphy – Peter O' Connell and Ferret Friends – Srah SLUH Rooney – Paddy Casey – Ocean Colour Scene – Republic of Loose – The Enemy – 28 Costumes – The Kinetiks – Badly Drawn Boy – Kíla – Tom Baxter – Buffalo Souljah – Delorentos – Newton Faulkner.

2008 festival
Cois Fharraige 2008 took place from 5–7 September in Kilkee, County Clare. It was headlined by Travis, Supergrass and The Zutons. Also appearing were The Futureheads, Seasick Steve, The Coronas, Cathy Davey, Kíla, Starsailor, Ocean Colour Scene and 28 Costumes. Early Bird three-day festival tickets cost €79.50 until 11 August and after that prices rise to €89.50. Tickets went on sale at 09:00 on Friday 13 June. They had sold out by 28 August. There were no day tickets on sale in 2008. Travis's headlining set received an honourable mention on RTÉ's Gigs of 2008 list.

2008 line-up

The Zutons – The Futureheads – The Coronas – The Kanyu Tree – Supergrass – Seasick Steve – Kíla – The Broken Family Band – 28 Costumes – Travis – Starsailor – Natty – Ocean Colour Scene's Simon and Oscar – The Joe Brown Band

2009 festival

Cois Fharraige 2009 took place from 11 to 13 September in Kilkee, County Clare. On 13 May 2009, it was reported that MCD had applied for a licence to hold the festival. It featured acts such as Doves, The Zutons, Newton Faulkner, Noah and the Whale, The Hold Steady, Stereo MCs, The Lightning Seeds and Jerry Fish & The Mudbug Club. The Blizzards and Laura Izibor were later added.

The 2009 festival was a flop and poorly attended. The organisers of the event suffered huge financial losses as a result. 2009 was the last year of Cois Fharraige.

References

2000s in Irish music
Kilkee
Rock festivals in Ireland
Surf culture
Ska festivals